Mushakiyeh (also Romanized as Mūshakīyeh, Mūsākheh, and Mūshkīyeh) is a village in Qahan Rural District, Khalajastan District, Qom County, Qom Province, Iran. At the 2006 census, its population was 46, in 19 families.

References 

Populated places in Qom Province